Satoshi Shinpo (born 26 October 1941) is a Japanese speed skater. He competed in four events at the 1964 Winter Olympics.

References

1941 births
Living people
Japanese male speed skaters
Olympic speed skaters of Japan
Speed skaters at the 1964 Winter Olympics
Sportspeople from Hokkaido
20th-century Japanese people